Trifolium fucatum is a species of clover known by the common names bull clover and sour clover. It is native to the western United States (California and Oregon), where it grows in many types of habitat, becoming common to abundant in some areas. It is an edible species of clover.

Description
Trifolium fucatum is an annual herb growing decumbent to erect in form. The stem is often thick-walled and hollow. The leaf blades are made up of oval or rounded leaflets with smooth or toothed edges, and the leaves have large stipules.

The inflorescence is a head of flowers with a base of wide bracts. Each flower corolla is 1 to 2 centimeters long and white or yellowish with purple tips. The flower becomes inflated as the fruit develops.

Planting 
When planting, scatter bull clover seeds in places that are free of weedy grasses. Try not to plant along with non-native clover species because they will be competition for native clovers.

The clover is susceptible to attacks from non-native slugs and snails, so measures may need to be taken to repel them.

Uses 
The leaves, flowers, young seedpods, and seeds are edible. Bull clover can be eaten before and during flowering. It can be eaten raw, baked, or steamed. Take care to remove a few leaves from each plant rather than destroying an entire plant when harvesting leaves for consumption. Bull clover has a better taste when grown in moist soils. Indigenous peoples were recorded as consuming the clovers from February to April, prior to the plants blooming.

It is recommended that the plant be dipped or boiled in salt water prior to consumption in order to prevent digestive upset. A small amount should be eaten in order to see how the body responds. In most cases, consuming moderate amounts of bull clover occurs without issue.

References

External links
Calflora Database: Trifolium fucatum (Bull clover, Sour clover)
Jepson Manual eFlora (TJM2) treatment of Trifolium fucatum
UC CalPhotos gallery:  Trifolium fucatum

fucatum
Flora of California
Flora of Oregon
Natural history of the California chaparral and woodlands
Natural history of the California Coast Ranges
Natural history of the Channel Islands of California
Natural history of the San Francisco Bay Area
Flora without expected TNC conservation status